The action of 8 January 1780 was a naval encounter off Cape Finisterre between a British Royal Naval fleet under Admiral Sir George Rodney, and a fleet of Spanish merchants sailing in convoy with seven warships of the Caracas Company, under the command of Commodore Don Juan Augustin de Yardi. During the action the entire Spanish convoy was captured.  Rodney's fleet was en route to relieve Gibraltar, and this action took place several days before Rodney's engagement and defeat of a Spanish fleet at the Battle of Cape St. Vincent.

Background

One of Spain's principal goals upon its entry into the American Revolutionary War in 1779 was the recovery of Gibraltar, which had been lost to England in 1704.  The Spanish consequently planned to retake Gibraltar by blockading and starving out its garrison, which included troops from Britain and the Electorate of Hanover.  The siege formally began in June 1779, with the Spanish establishing a land blockade around The Rock.  The matching naval blockade was comparatively weak, and the British discovered that small fast ships could evade the blockaders, while slower and larger supply ships generally could not.  By late 1779, however, supplies in Gibraltar had become seriously depleted, and General George Eliott appealed to London for relief.

A supply convoy was organized, and in late December 1779 a large fleet sailed from England under the command of Admiral Sir George Brydges Rodney.  Although Rodney's final destination was the West Indies, he had secret instructions to first resupply Gibraltar and Menorca.

Action
On 4 January Rodney parted with the ship of the line  under Sir John Hamilton, and the frigates ,  and  under Captains Hyde Parker, H. Bryne and William Dickson respectively, to escort the West Indies-bound merchants. The following day Rodney encountered a Spanish convoy consisting of 22 ships, bound from San Sebastián to Cádiz.

He closed on them, the copper sheathing on some of his ships allowing them to outsail the Spanish. The whole convoy was captured, except for one merchant vessel.

Aftermath
Rodney found the Spanish ships to be carrying provisions useful to Gibraltar and so used them to relieve the British forces there. In addition Rodney commissioned and manned the captured Spanish flagship, the 64-gun Guipuzcoana, naming her , in honour of Prince William, who was present at the engagement. Rodney remarked in his despatches to the Admiralty that the loss of the ships "must greatly distress the enemy, who I am well informed are in much want of provisions and naval stores". Several days later Rodney engaged and defeated a Spanish fleet under Don Juan de Lángara at the Battle of Cape St Vincent, on 16 January 1780, before going on to relieve Gibraltar and Menorca. The 16-gun San Fermin that was captured in this action was also commissioned to serve in the Royal Navy, and then would be recovered by the Spanish in April 1781.

Ships involved
The order of battle is as reported by Beatson.

British fleet
  (90) Admiral Sir George Brydges Rodney, Captain Walter Young
  (98) Rear-Admiral Robert Digby, Captain Philip Patton
  (100) Rear-Admiral John Lockhart Ross, Captain J. Bourmaster
  (74) Captain J. Brisbane
  (74) Captain S. Uvedale
  (74) Captain Edmund Affleck
  (74) Captain George Balfour
  (74) Captain J. Peyton
  (74) Captain John Elliot
  (74) Captain J. Houlton
  (74) Captain Adam Duncan
  (74) Captain Mark Robinson
  (74) Captain J. Douglas
  (74) Captain Chaloner Ogle
  (74) Captain S. Cornish
  (74) Captain James Cranston
  (74) Captain T. Penny
  (74) Captain S. Wallis
  (64) Captain S. Thompson
  (64) Captain John MacBride
  (32) Captain Henry Harvey
  (28) Captain George Montagu
  (24) Captain Skeffington Lutwidge
  (24) Captain John Bazely
  (24) Captain Lord Hugh Seymour
  (24) Captain Edward Thomson

Spanish fleet

Caracas Company warships
 Guipuzcoano (64) Commodore Don Juan Augustin de Yardi, Captain Don Tomás de Malay
 San Carlos (32) Captain Don Firmin Urtizberea
 San Rafael (30) Captain Don Luis Aranburu
 Santa Teresa (28) Captain Don Jose J. de Mendizabal
 San Bruno (26) Captain J. M. de Goicoechea
 San Fermín (16) Captain J. Vin. Eloy Sanchez
 San Vicente (10) Captain Don José de Ugalde

Merchants
 Nuestra Señora de L'Oves
 San Francisco
 La Concepción
 San Nicolás
 San Jerónimo
 Divina Providencia
 San Gavilán
 San Pacora
 San Lauren
 La Providencia
 La Bellona
 Esperanza
 Le Cidada de Mercia
 La Amistad
 San Miguel

References
Citations

Bibliography
 
 
 
 The life and correspondence of the late Admiral Lord Rodney, Volume 1 By Godfrey Basil Mundy
 
 
 

Conflicts in 1780
Naval battles involving Spain
Naval battles involving Great Britain
Naval battles of the Anglo-Spanish War (1779–1783)
Naval battles of the American Revolutionary War